The North African fire salamander (Salamandra algira) is a species of salamander in the family Salamandridae found in Algeria, Morocco, Ceuta, and possibly Tunisia. Its natural habitats are temperate forests, rivers, and caves. It is threatened by habitat loss.

Subspecies
S. a. algira Mt. Edough (Algeria)-Neotype
S. a. tingitana Jabal Mousa (Morocco)
S. a. spelaea Ouartass (Morocco)
S. a. splendens Aïn Tissimilan (Morocco) 
S. a. atlantica Jbel Tazekka (Morocco)

Distribution and habitat
The North African fire salamander is endemic to northwestern Africa where it is found only in the Rif Mountains and Middle Atlas Mountains in northern Morocco, the Spanish enclave of Ceuta, and the coastal mountains of northern Algeria. It has been recorded from northern Tunisia, but this may be an error. Its habitat is typically the floor of moist forests of oak and cedar where it hides under roots and stones. It is also known from caves.

Ecology
Over most of its range, the North African fire salamander is ovoviviparous with eight to 50 eggs per batch, females retaining the eggs internally until they hatch, with the young being nurtured from the egg yolks. However, in the Tingitana region, the young seem to obtain their nourishment, at least in part from the female, in the form of secreted fluids and are considered viviparous. This results in fifteen or so larvae which are deposited in streams or pools.

Status
Although locally common in places, the North African fire salamander is rare in others and has a fragmented distribution range. The main threat it faces is the destruction of its forest habitat. Other threats include the channelling of the forest streams for irrigation, overgrazing by livestock, and collection of the salamanders for the pet trade. The International Union for Conservation of Nature has assessed its conservation status as being "vulnerable".

Sources

Donaire-Barroso, D., Martinez-Solano, I., Salvador, A., Garcia-Paris, M., Gil, E.R., Tahar, S. & El Mouden, E.H. 2004. 

Salamandra
Amphibians described in 1883
Amphibians of North Africa
Amphibians of Europe
Taxa named by Jacques von Bedriaga
Taxonomy articles created by Polbot